Pyotr Yurievich Dranga (Moscow), Also known as Peter Dranga, is a Russian accordionist, singer and composer based in Los Angeles, CA.

Dranga's father, Yuir Petrovich Dranga, is a classical accordion player and introduced the instrument to Pyotr at a young age.  Dranga was the first to incorporate the accordion in electronic music, which he brought to the Russian and world stages.

Life and career
Dranga was born in 1984 in a family of musicians. His father, Yuri Petrovich Dranga – is a professor at Gnessin Academy of Music Art in Russia, People's Artist of Russia; his mother- Elena Kirillovna Dranga. 

In 1999 he was named Laureate at the VII Moscow Open Music Competition and began his concert career organized by Russian Cultural Foundation. 

In 2008, he presented his first CD. Pyotr prefers to play on the instruments of the Italian brand Bugari Armando.As of May 2022, Dranga has 11 releases on Spotify.

Discography

References

External links 

 
  Piotr Dranga in Argumenty i Fakty
 Concert in Samara
 Peter Dranga took part in the project named Dancing on ice, where he took the third place with Oksana Grishuk
 Russian Tango
 Gnesein music academy

1984 births
Living people
Russian accordionists
Russian folk-pop singers
21st-century accordionists
21st-century Russian singers
21st-century Russian male singers